The final of the Men's 100 metres Backstroke event at the European LC Championships 1997 was held on Saturday 23 August 1997 in Seville, Spain.

Finals

Qualifying heats

See also
1996 Men's Olympic Games 100m Backstroke
1997 Men's World Championships (SC) 100m Backstroke

References
 scmsom results
 La Gazzetta Archivio
 swimrankings

B